Arkhypenko, also transliterated as Arkhipenko, Archipenko, is a Ukrainian-language family name of patronymic derivation from the Slavic first name Arkhyp/Arkhip. The Belarusian-language version is Arkhipienka.

The surname may refer to:
Alexander Archipenko (1887–1964), Ukrainian artist
Eugene Archipenko (1884–1959), Ukrainian politician and agronomist
Fyodor Arkhipenko (1921–2012), Soviet-Belarusian flying ace
Vasyl Arkhypenko (born 1957), Soviet-Ukrainian athlete

See also
 
 
 
 6535 Archipenko, asteroid

Ukrainian-language surnames